Pastor Irene Manjeri is a Ugandan Pastor and the head of healing centre church in Kitovu.

Background 
Manjeri has been married to Dr. Vicent Katongole for about 21 years whom they have since separated.

Before she became pastor, she says she was raped and impregnated by an MP while she was still a teenager and as a result got her first son.

She has a set of twins with her husband.

Controversy 
pastor Manjeri was one time arrested for ordering the beating of a 15-year-old girl. She ordered her guards to beat her in order to cast demons out of her.

She once claimed that she bleached to please God.

She also one time claimed she met jesus, that jesus was wearing a Kanzu.

References 

Living people
Year of birth missing (living people)
Ugandan clergy
Women Christian clergy